The battle of Sassello was a minor skirmish during the war of the Second Coalition, fought on 10 April 1800 between a 2,000-men French force under General Jean-de-Dieu Soult and a largely superior Austrian corps under the command of Prince Prince Hohenzollern. The battle took place 30 kilometers northwest of Genoa, which was at the time under French control but under siege by the Austrians. The skirmish at Sassello ended in favor of the Austrians, with either side losing about 1,000 men but with the Austrians being able to pursue their encirclement of Genoa.

References

Bibliography
 Pigeard, Alain - Dictionnaire des batailles de Napoléon, Tallandier, Bibliothèque Napoléonienne, 2004, 

Battles of the French Revolutionary Wars
Battles in Liguria
History of Genoa
Conflicts in 1800
1800 in Italy
1800 in Austria
1800 in France